= Gienow =

Gienow is a German surname.

== People ==
- Dale Gienow, Canadian Animal trainer
- Hanna Gienow (born 1943), German politician (CDU)
- Jessica C. E. Gienow-Hecht (born 1964), Author
- Peter Gienow (born 1960), German homeopath and author

== Other uses ==
Gienow Windows & Doors Canadian manufacturer of windows and doors
